Wanderson Santos Pereira (born 7 February 1991), simply known as Wanderson, is a Brazilian footballer who plays mainly as a centre back for América Mineiro.

Club career
Born in Vitória da Conquista, Bahia, Wanderson represented Internacional as a youth. He made his debut as a senior with Francana, in 2011.

In 2012 Wanderson moved to Montes Claros EC, but returned to the São Paulo state shortly after, joining Sertãozinho. After impressing with the latter in 2013 Campeonato Paulista Série A3, he signed for Corinthians.

Wanderson remained at Timão for nearly a year, but failed to make a single appearance for the club, and on 18 August 2014 moved to Treze. In November, he agreed to a contract with São Bento ahead of 2015 Campeonato Paulista.

On 28 April 2015 Wanderson joined Série B club Criciúma. An undisputed starter for the club, he scored three goals in 33 appearances before moving to Ferroviária on 15 December.

On 16 May 2016 Wanderson moved to Série A club Atlético Paranaense. He made his top tier debut on 1 June, coming on as a substitute for Cleberson in a 0–1 away loss against former club Internacional.

Honours
Atlético Paranaense
Copa Sudamericana: 2018

Bahia
Campeonato Baiano: 2020

Fortaleza
Campeonato Cearense: 2021

Atlético Goianiense
Campeonato Goiano: 2022

References

External links

1991 births
Living people
People from Vitória da Conquista
Brazilian footballers
Association football defenders
Campeonato Brasileiro Série A players
Campeonato Brasileiro Série B players
Campeonato Brasileiro Série C players
Associação Atlética Francana players
Sertãozinho Futebol Clube players
Sport Club Corinthians Paulista players
Treze Futebol Clube players
Esporte Clube São Bento players
Criciúma Esporte Clube players
Associação Ferroviária de Esportes players
Club Athletico Paranaense players
Esporte Clube Bahia players
Fortaleza Esporte Clube players
Atlético Clube Goianiense players
América Futebol Clube (MG) players
J1 League players
Shimizu S-Pulse players
Brazilian expatriate footballers
Brazilian expatriate sportspeople in Japan
Expatriate footballers in Japan
Sportspeople from Bahia